"Like Home" is a song by Dutch DJ and producer Nicky Romero and Australian twin sisters NERVO. It was the third single released from Romero's label, Protocol Recordings. It was also the second song from the label to top the Beatport Top 100 chart. It peaked at number 33 in the UK Singles Chart.

Music video
A music video to accompany the release of "Like Home" was directed by Kyle Padilla and released onto YouTube on 21 February 2013 at a total length of three minutes and thirty-nine seconds.

Track listing

Chart performance

Release history

References

2012 singles
2012 songs
Nicky Romero songs
Nervo (DJs) songs
Song recordings produced by Nervo (DJs)
Songs written by Miriam Nervo
Songs written by Nicky Romero
Songs written by Olivia Nervo